In enzymology, a carbon-monoxide dehydrogenase (ferredoxin) is an enzyme that catalyzes the chemical reaction

CO + H2O + oxidized ferredoxin  CO2 + reduced ferredoxin

The 3 substrates of this enzyme are CO, H2O, and oxidized ferredoxin, whereas its two products are CO2 and reduced ferredoxin.

This enzyme belongs to the family of oxidoreductases, specifically those acting on the aldehyde or oxo group of donor with an iron-sulfur protein as acceptor.  The systematic name of this enzyme class is carbon-monoxide,water:ferredoxin oxidoreductase.

References

 
 
 

EC 1.2.7
Enzymes of unknown structure
Carbon monoxide